Tim Collins may refer to:

 Tim Collins (equestrian) (born 1975), Bermudian Olympic equestrian
 Tim Collins (financier) (born 1956), American businessman and financier
 Tim Collins (politician) (born 1964), British MP for Westmorland and Lonsdale, 1997–2005
 Tim Collins (British Army officer) (born 1960), lieutenant colonel in the British army in the 2003 Iraq war
 Tim Collins (manager), former manager for the band Aerosmith
 Tim Collins (baseball) (born 1989), Major League Baseball pitcher
 Tim Collins (footballer) (1889–1971), Australian rules footballer
 Tim Collins (Neighbours), fictional character on the Australian soap opera Neighbours
 Tim Collins (golfer) (born 1945)), American professional golfer

See also
Tim Collin